Hugh Ferris or Ferriss may refer to:

 Hugh Ferriss (1889–1962), American architect, illustrator, and poet
 Hugh Ferris (rugby union) (1877–1929), South African rugby union player 
 Hugh Ferris (presenter), English television, radio, podcast and events presenter